Xuzhou railway station is a railway station at the intersection of the north–south Beijing–Shanghai railway and the east–west Longhai Railway. The station is located in Yunlong District, Xuzhou, Jiangsu, China.

History

The station was opened in 1910 as Xuzhoufu railway station on Tianjin–Pukou railway (now part of Beijing–Shanghai railway). In 1915, the station was connected with Longhai railway.

In 1927, the station was renamed as Xuzhou railway station and was later renamed as Tongshan railway station  in 1936. The station was destroyed in the Battle of Xuzhou in 1938 and the Japanese invaders took control of the station after the battle and reconditioned it.

The name of the station was changed back to Xuzhou railway station after the war against Japan. The station was again destroyed in Huaihai Campaign in 1948, and was reconditioned after the Communists took over Xuzhou in December 1948.

After the war, the station have been expanded and renovated several times. The latest renovation, including new platform canopies and refurbishment of the facade of the station building, started in September 2008 and was finished in February 2010.

Metro station
The station is served by Line 1 and Line 3 of the Xuzhou Metro.

Gallery

References

External links

Xuzhou Railway Station

Railway stations in Jiangsu
Stations on the Beijing–Shanghai Railway
Stations on the Longhai Railway
Railway stations in China opened in 1910